Alexander Schmirl (born 19 September 1989) is an Austrian sports shooter. He competed in the men's 10 metre air rifle event at the 2016 Summer Olympics.

References

External links
 

1989 births
Living people
Austrian male sport shooters
Olympic shooters of Austria
Shooters at the 2016 Summer Olympics
Place of birth missing (living people)
European Games competitors for Austria
Shooters at the 2019 European Games
21st-century Austrian people